"If I Was" is a 1985 song by Scottish musician Midge Ure. It was co-written by Ure and Danny Mitchell (of Ultravox's tour opening band Messengers), and released as the first single from Ure's debut solo studio album The Gift (1985). It reached No. 1 on the UK Singles Chart for one week in September 1985.

In the sleeve notes for the 2001 compilation If I Was: The Very Best of Midge Ure & Ultravox Ure wrote:
"This song is pure Danny Mitchell. I found a demo of it on a cassette Danny had sent me for his band The Messengers. I grabbed it with both hands, messed around with it, sprinkled it with fairy dust and the rest is history."

Ure played all instruments on the song except bass guitar, which was played by Mark King of Level 42.

Music video
The music video featured Ure's face patterns on a Pin Art pinscreen.

B-sides
The instrumental "Piano" was released on the B-side of the 7" and 12" singles. The 12" single featured a second track: a cover version of David Bowie's "The Man Who Sold the World", an earlier version of which was originally released on the film soundtrack of Party Party (1983). Both songs were added as bonus tracks to the CD reissue of The Gift in 1996.

Chart performance

References

External links 
 

1985 singles
Midge Ure songs
UK Singles Chart number-one singles
Irish Singles Chart number-one singles
Songs written by Midge Ure
1985 songs
Chrysalis Records singles